Vernon is a surname, from a masculine name that is derived from the Gallic word vern for Alder tree (also springlike, flourishing, or full of life) and a Gaulish-Latin suffix indicating a location. Thus Vernon is a "place of alders". Variants include Vern, Vernard, Verne, Verna, Sberna, Sberno. Vernon was introduced into England as an aristocratic surname at the time of the Norman conquest. It was adapted into Spanish as "Vernón".

Earliest use as a surname 

The earliest known use of Vernon as a surname dates from 1031 in Normandy, when a Hugh son of Roger de Vernon granted the church of St Peter in Fourques (probably either the present day Saint Paul de Fourques or St Eloi de Fourques) to the Abbey of St Ouen in Rouen.

A few years later Hugh was recorded as one of the men consenting to a grant of land by Duke Robert of Normandy to the abbey of St Wandrille at Serville, ten miles north of Rouen. Although Hugh and his family were to become lords of the town and castle of Vernon later in the eleventh century, Hugh was not its lord at the time of this charter as the Dukes of Normandy held this title personally until 1035. In that year Duke William, Robert’s son, then granted the title to his cousin, Guy de Burgundy. The lordship seems to have passed to Hugh de Vernon in 1047 following the failed rebellion of Guy de Burgundy. Hugh survived until the early 1050s when he was succeeded as lord of Vernon by his son William.

For descendants of this family see:-
 Vernon family
 Vernon baronets
 Baron Vernon
 Earl of Shipbrook
 Edward Vernon (1684–1757), British admiral

Other Vernons

 Annabel Vernon, British rower
 Barbara Vernon (activist), Australian maternity activist and government lobbyist
 Barbara Vernon (writer) (1916–1978), Australian playwright and screenwriter
 Belinda Vernon, New Zealand politician
 Bobby Vernon, film actor
 Caroline Vernon, English author
 Charles Vernon, American musician
 Chris Vernon, British military spokesman
 Dai Vernon (1894–1992), Canadian magician
 David Vernon (writer), Australian writer
 Forbes George Vernon, Canadian legislator
 Gavin Vernon, Scottish folk hero active in the removal of the Stone of Scone in 1950
 George Vernon, English cricketer
 Howard Vernon, Swiss actor
 Irene Vernon, American actress
 Jackie Vernon (comedian), comedian
 Jackie Vernon (footballer)
 John Vernon (1932–2005), Canadian actor
 Judy Vernon, English athlete
 Jules Vernon, vaudeville performer
 Justin Vernon (born 1981), American musician-songwriter
 Kate Vernon (born 1961), Canadian actress
 Konstanze Vernon, German ballet dancer
 Mabel Vernon, American suffragist
 Melinda Vernon, Australian deaf athlete
 Michael Vernon (1932–1993), Australian consumer activist
 Mickey Vernon (1918–2008), American Major League Baseball player
 Mike Vernon (ice hockey) (born 1963), Canadian retired National Hockey League goaltender
 Mike Vernon (record producer) (born 1944), British record producer
 Nan Vernon, Canadian musician
 Olivier Vernon (born 1990), American football player
 Patrick Vernon, British social activist
 Philip A. Vernon, Canadian psychology professor
 Philip E. Vernon, English psychology professor
 Richard Vernon (disambiguation)
 Robert Vernon (disambiguation)
 Roy Vernon, Welsh footballer
 Scott Vernon, English footballer
 Valerie Vernon, American actress
 Ursula Vernon, American writer
 Walter Liberty Vernon, English-born Australian architect 
 William Vernon, Rhode Islander active in the American Revolution
 Hansol Vernon Chwe, Korean- American singer

References

English-language surnames
Surnames of Norman origin